Gaussian field may refer to:

A field of Gaussian rationals in number theory
Gaussian free field, a concept in statistical mechanics
A Gaussian random field, a field of Gaussian-distributed random variables